The 1000 meters distance for women in the 2015–16 ISU Speed Skating World Cup will be contested over 7 races on six occasions, out of a total of World Cup occasions for the season, with the first occasion taking place in Calgary, Alberta, Canada, on 13–15 November 2015, and the final occasion taking place in Heerenveen, Netherlands, on 11–13 March 2016.

The defending champion is Brittany Bowe of the United States.

Top three

Race medallists

Standings

References 

 
Women 1000